Events during the year 2016 in Northern Ireland.

Incumbents
 First Minister - Peter Robinson 
 deputy First Minister - Martin McGuiness 
 Secretary of State - Theresa Villiers (until 14 July), James Brokenshire (from 14 July)

Events 

 11 January – Arlene Foster becomes the first women to lead the Democratic Unionist Party and becomes Northern Ireland's first woman First Minister.
 8 March – Austins (department store) in Derry closes suddenly after 186 years' trading.
 5 May – 2016 Northern Ireland Assembly election. There is no significant change to the position of the main parties.
 4 October – Flights are disrupted at Belfast International Airport after a freight plane gets stuck on the runway.

The arts

Sports

Deaths 

 7 January – Paddy Doherty, activist (born 1926)
 12 January – Robert Black, serial killer (born 1947 in Scotland)
 25 June - Patrick Mayhew, 10th Secretary of State for Northern Ireland (born 1929).

See also 
 2016 in England
 2016 in Scotland
 2016 in Wales

References 

Northern Ireland